The Summit railway station is located on the Southern line in Queensland, Australia. It services the town of The Summit, a fruit growing district in the Granite Belt.

History
The Summit station opened on 3 March 1881, when the Queensland Railway's Southern line was extended from Warwick to Stanthorpe. It was served by freight trains conveying apples for Golden Circle until 2007.

References

External links

The Summit When there were Trains gallery

Darling Downs
Disused railway stations in Queensland
Railway stations in Australia opened in 1881
Southern railway line, Queensland